United Supermarkets, d.b.a. The United Family is an American supermarket chain.  With headquarters in Lubbock, Texas, its roots go back to 1916, when H.D. Snell opened his first United Cash Store in Sayre, Oklahoma. The chain has grown to include 95 stores in 30 Texas cities and over 10,000 workers. In 2014 it became a wholly-owned subsidiary of Albertsons.

History
United Supermarkets has 94 stores located in Texas and New Mexico.  While it shares the same name as United Supermarkets based in Oklahoma (owned by Homeland), it technically does business as The United Family to differentiate from the Oklahoma chain, as they are separate grocery entities.

On April 1, 2009, United opened its 50th store in Plano, Texas.

Most United Supermarkets stores operate from 6 or 7 am until 11 pm, seven days a week.  As of February 1, 2016, four stores operate 24 hours a day, including the pharmacy: two stores in Lubbock, one in Wichita Falls, and one in Frisco (Of which is no longer a 24-hour location as of 2019). Two stores were open 24 hours a day temporarily after the opening of the new store. Both were located in Lubbock.

United Supermarkets is run by the Albertsons chain, and operates as a division of Albertsons.

Acquisition
On September 9, 2013, United Supermarkets LLC was sold to Albertsons LLC. On February 4, 2014, the FTC voted 4–0 to approve the deal. The acquisition deal cost Albertsons $385 million and required Albertsons to sell its single stores in the Amarillo and Wichita Falls, Texas, markets. As part of the acquisition, several Albertsons locations in Eastern New Mexico, which were re-branded as "Albertsons Market", were added to the new United division of Albertsons-Safeway. Expansion in New Mexico continued with the purchase of several Lawrence Brothers locations, and the transfer of stores in Albuquerque, Santa Fe, Rio Rancho, and Taos, to the United division.

The United Family operates five distinct retail banners:

 United Supermarket - traditional grocery offerings
 Market Street - take-out foods, restaurants, gourmet, and everyday grocery items
 Amigos United - international and American foods
 United Express - take-out foods, café, and gas station
 Albertsons Market - traditional American grocery

Naming rights
United Supermarkets owns the naming rights to United Supermarkets Arena at Texas Tech University. The arena is the home court for the university's men's and women's basketball teams in addition to its women's volleyball team.

References

External links
United Supermarkets website
Market Street United
Amigos United
Albertsons Market

Supermarkets of the United States
Companies based in Lubbock, Texas
Retail companies established in 1916
1916 establishments in Texas
Cerberus Capital Management companies
Safeway Inc.
2014 mergers and acquisitions